Kaoh Nheaek is a district (srok) in Mondulkiri Province, Cambodia.

References

Districts of Mondulkiri province